Amon Gordon (born October 13, 1981) is a former American football defensive end of the National Football League. He was drafted by the Cleveland Browns in the fourth round of the 2004 NFL Draft. He played college football at Stanford.

Gordon has also been a member of the Denver Broncos, Baltimore Ravens, Tennessee Titans, Philadelphia Eagles, New England Patriots, and Seattle Seahawks.

Early years
Gordon attended Oak Harbor High School in Washington state where he was the only Freshman on the varsity football and basketball teams.  After his freshman year, Gordon transferred to Mariner High School, in Everett, Washington and played football there as a sophomore and junior. As a senior, he transferred to Mira Mesa Senior High School in San Diego California, where he played running back and defense. He was named first-team all-state and league offensive MVP.

College career
Gordon played college football at Stanford where he redshirted in his freshman season in 2000. As a redshirt freshman in 2001, Gordon played defensive end and inside linebacker. In 2002, as a starter, Gordon had four sacks and two fumble recoveries. Gordon moved to defensive tackle for his final season in 2003, and finished his college career with 35 games (18 starts), 71 tackles, and seven sacks.

Professional career

Cleveland Browns
Gordon was selected by the Cleveland Browns in the 4th round (161st overall) in the 2004 NFL Draft. In his rookie season, he played in six games and posted ten tackles. His second season with the Browns was ended by a knee injury that ruled him out for the entire year.

Denver Broncos
Gordon was signed by the Denver Broncos to their practice squad on March 22, 2006, after being waived by the Browns. He played in all four preseason games before being waived on September 2, 2006. He was re-signed to the team's practice squad the next day, where he spent the entire season. Gordon made the Broncos' 53-man roster in 2007, and played in four games, recording 13 tackles, before being waived on November 6, 2007.

Baltimore Ravens
Gordon was signed to the practice squad of the Baltimore Ravens on November 21, 2007. He was promoted to the Ravens' 53-man roster on December 9 and played in one of the Ravens' final four games, recording three tackles. He was not tendered as a restricted free agent following the season but was re-signed in March 2008 and released on August 29, 2008.

Tennessee Titans
Gordon was signed to the Titans practice squad on November 5, 2008. He was activated from the practice squad on December 20, 2008. Gordon recorded six tackles in the final two games for the Titans. He was waived on January 6, 2009 during the playoffs.

Philadelphia Eagles
On January 21, 2009, Gordon was signed to a future deal by the Philadelphia Eagles. He was placed on injured reserve on June 11 with a torn Achilles tendon and was released with an injury settlement on August 11.

New England Patriots
Gordon signed with the New England Patriots on April 21, 2010. On June 10, 2010, the Patriots released Gordon.

Seattle Seahawks
Gordan signed with the Seattle Seahawks on August 18, 2010. He was released on September 4, 2010.

Second stint with Titans
The Titans re-signed Gordon on October 5, 2010. He was released again on November 9, 2010.

Second stint with Seahawks
The Seahawks re-signed Gordon on November 23, 2010.

Kansas City Chiefs
After his contract with Seattle expired, Gordon signed with the Kansas City Chiefs on August 6, 2011. Gordon had his first sack as a Chief, during the Chiefs/Patriots game. The Chiefs would go on to lose that game 3-34. The next week, Gordon had his second sack against the Steelers. The Chiefs would lose the game 13-9. Gordon finished the season with two sacks and 23 tackles.
In 2012, Amon Gordon was released in the last rounds of roster cuts with the Chiefs.

Personal life
He resides in San Diego, California with his wife, Roxanne, his daughter Jasmyn, and his son.

He suffers from dementia and is not able to work.

References

External links
Philadelphia Eagles bio

1981 births
Living people
Players of American football from San Diego
American football defensive tackles
Stanford Cardinal football players
Cleveland Browns players
Denver Broncos players
Baltimore Ravens players
Tennessee Titans players
Philadelphia Eagles players
New England Patriots players
Seattle Seahawks players
Kansas City Chiefs players
Sportspeople from Queens, New York
Players of American football from New York City